Louise Cotton Mill is a historic textile mill located at Charlotte, Mecklenburg County, North Carolina. The original section was built in 1897, and is a two-story, 27 bay long, rectangular brick building. The original section has segmental-arched windows and a low-pitched gable roof had a monitor with clerestory windows. It was enlarged in 1901 by two one-story sections to form a "U"-shaped building with a courtyard.

It was added to the National Register of Historic Places in 2013.

References

Textile mills in North Carolina
Industrial buildings and structures on the National Register of Historic Places in North Carolina
Industrial buildings completed in 1897
Buildings and structures in Charlotte, North Carolina
National Register of Historic Places in Mecklenburg County, North Carolina